Rossen Kirchev Petkov is a Bulgarian writer and teacher, one of the country's pioneers in the field of digital arts, computer graphics and multimedia. He is the author of dozens of articles about modern media in education and learning, founded a network of students information and career centers in Bulgaria and is chair of the organizational committee of Computer Space forum - an international forum for computer art.

Biography 
Rossen Petkov is born in Haskovo. In 1985 he graduated the Todor Velev Math High School, and in 1990 - the Technical University, Sofia.

In 1987, while still a student, he started working on projects, developing algorithms and programs for electronic music and computer graphics. In 1991 – 1992 he is editor and writer of the Graphics with computer magazine, where he has his own column, Computer Arts. In the beginning of the 1990s Petkov founded one of the first computer arts organizations in Bulgaria, the Student Computer Art Society (SCAS), with members among students, artists and experts in the field of modern media and digital arts.

Rossen Petkov is teaching Methods, algorithms and applications in computer graphics at the Technical University - Sofia, New Bulgarian University and others.

At the end of the 1990s Petkov founded students and youth information centers, using the Internet and data bases for search of information that would benefit young people – educational, job, travel, funding for start-up projects, etc. Under his guidance, SCAS joined effort with the governmental Committee for Youth and Sports to found a representative office of the international youth information network Eurodesk.

Bibliography 

 Petkov R. Musical Creativity and Microcomputers, "Young Constructor" Magazine, ISSN 0204-8469, Sofia, vol. 1, 1988, p. 2-3 
 Boyanov Y., R. Petkov, Program "Composer1", "Young constructor" magazine, ISSN 0204-8469, Sofia, vol. 4, 1988, pp. I-IV 
 Boyanov Y., S. Lazarov, R. Petkov, Method and Program for Various Variations, "Computer for You", ISSN 0205-1893, Sofia, vol. 1., 1989, 
 Petkov R., Program for Three-dimensional Graphics, Computer Graphics Magazine, ISSN 0861-4636, Sofia, issue no. 1, 1992, pp. 14–15 
 Petkov R., MIDI standard for communication between digital musical institutions, Computer Graphics Magazine, ISSN 0861-4636, Sofia, issue 2, 1992, pp. 14–16 
 Petkov R., Graphic design, PC & Mac World magazine, ISSN 0737-8939, Sofia, issue no. 7, 1994, pp. 92–94 
 Petkov, R., Multimedia development and computer arts in Bulgaria, Balkanmedia magazine, V3, Balkanmedia, C: 1996, p. 25-26 
 Petkov, R. Trends and Problems in the Development of Multimedia Technologies in Bulgaria, Bulgarian Media-learning (collected papers), Balkanmedia, C: 1996, .- 1 (1996), pp. 354–360 
 Petkov R., D. Davitt, D. Donedd, Career Development Manual for Consultants, SCAS, C: 2004,  
 Petkov R. ed., Computer Space festival catalog (CD), SCAS, C: 2004,  
 Petkov R. ed., EuroNET- Youth Resources in Internet Catalog (CD), 5th edition, SCAS, C: 2005, MC 11645 
 Petkov R., Tsv. Ilieva, others, E-Games: successful implementation of e-games in youth work manual, SCAS, C: 2007,  
 Petkov R., Tsv. Ilieva, others, Quality Assurance in Youth Career Consultancy Manual, SCAS, C: 2008,  
 Petkov R., W. Hilzensauer, others, ePortfolio for your future manual, SCAS, C: 2009,  
 Petkov R., About Old Books and Computer Arts, Monograph, SCAS, C: 2010,2012 (Second revised Edition),  
 Petkov R., E. Licheva, others, "Validation of self-acquired learning and credit transfer in web design and computer animation" manual, Rosen Petkov, SCAS: 2013,  
 Elitsa Licheva, Rosen Petkov, "E-Portfolio for the Evaluation of Informal Learning in Web Design and Computer Animation", Proceedings of ePIC 2013, 11th International ePortfolio and Identity Conference, London, 8-9-10 July 2013, ISBN 978- 2-9540144-3-2, p. 179-180 
 Petkov R., E. Licheva et al., Guide "Design of Binding and Conservation of Old Books, Albums and Documents", S: Central Library of Bulgarian Academy of Sciences, 2014 
 Petkov R., E. Licheva, D. Atanasova, Electronic Learning and Computer Design (CAD) of Binding, Vocational Education Magazine, vol. 16 pcs. 6, 2014, pp. 573–588 
 Petkov, R., D. Krastev, E. Licheva and others, Binding Design and Paper Conservation of Antique Books, Albums and Documents, Manual, SCAS 2014,  
 Petkov R., E. Licheva and others, Mobile Games in Youth Work Manual, NSICC, 2015,  
 Petkov R., E. Licheva and Others, Self-Guidance and Modern Media Literacy Manual, 2016,

References 

1967 births
Bulgarian businesspeople
Living people